Baron Marchamley, of Hawkestone in the County of Salop, is a title in the Peerage of the United Kingdom. It was created in 1908 for the Liberal politician George Whiteley, who had previously represented Stockport and Pudsey in the House of Commons.  the title is held by his great-grandson, the fourth Baron, who succeeded his father in 1994.

The Conservative politician Sir Herbert Huntington-Whiteley, 1st Baronet, was the younger brother of the first Baron.

Barons Marchamley (1908)
George Whiteley, 1st Baron Marchamley (1855–1925)
William Tattersall Whiteley, 2nd Baron Marchamley (1886–1949)
John William Tattersall Whiteley, 3rd Baron Marchamley (1922–1994)
William Francis Whiteley, 4th Baron Marchamley (b. 1968)

The heir apparent is the present holder's son, the Hon. Leon Whiteley (b. 2004)

Arms

See also
Huntington-Whiteley baronets

Notes

References

Kidd, Charles, Williamson, David (editors). Debrett's Peerage and Baronetage (1990 edition). New York: St Martin's Press, 1990, 

Baronies in the Peerage of the United Kingdom
Noble titles created in 1908
Noble titles created for UK MPs
Whiteley family